Chatan may refer to:
 Chatan, Iran, a village in Iran
 Qolqoleh-ye Chatan, a village in Iran
 Chatan, Okinawa, a town in Japan
Chatan (surname)